Northern American English or Northern U.S. English (also, Northern AmE) is a class of historically related American English dialects, spoken by predominantly white Americans, in much of the Great Lakes region and some of the Northeast region within the United States. The North as a super-dialect region is best documented by the 2006 Atlas of North American English (ANAE) in the greater metropolitan areas of Connecticut, Western Massachusetts, Western and Central New York, Northwestern New Jersey, Northeastern Pennsylvania, Northern Ohio, Northern Indiana, Northern Illinois, Northeastern Nebraska, and Eastern South Dakota, plus among certain demographics or areas within Michigan, Wisconsin, Minnesota, Vermont, and New York's Hudson Valley. The ANAE describes that the North, at its core, consists of the Inland Northern dialect (in the eastern Great Lakes region) and Southwestern New England dialect. 

The ANAE argues that, though geographically located in the Northern United States, current-day Northwestern U.S., New York City, Eastern New England and some Upper Midwestern accents do not fit under the Northern U.S. accent spectrum, or only marginally. Each has one or more phonological characteristics that disqualifies them. Meanwhile, Central and Western Canadian English is presumed to have originated but branched off from Northern U.S. English within the past two or three centuries. 

Northern U.S. accents are often distinguished from Southern U.S. accents by retaining  as a diphthong (unlike the South, which commonly monophthongizes this sound) and from Western U.S. and Canadian accents by mostly preserving the distinction between the /ɑ/ and /ɔ/ sounds in words like cot versus caught (except in the transitional dialect region of the Upper Midwest and variably in other Northern areas, especially among younger Americans). 

In the very early 20th century, a generic Northern U.S. accent was the basis for the term "General American", though regional accents have now since developed in some areas of the North.

Phonology
The ANAE defines a Northern linguistic super-region of American English dialects as follows:  (as in goat, toe, show, etc.) and traditionally  (as in goose, too, shoe, etc.) pronounced conservatively far in the back of the mouth, "r-fulness" (or rhoticity), and a common lack of the cot–caught merger, meaning that words like pond and pawned, or bot and bought, are not pronounced identically (with the second of this class of words being pronounced usually farther back in the mouth and with more rounded lips).

The Northern Cities Vowel Shift is a series of sound changes in the North that covers a large area from western New York State west through the U.S. Great Lakes region and areas of the Upper Midwest.

A phenomenon known as "Canadian raising"—the lifting of the body of the tongue in both  and  before voiceless consonants (therefore, in words, like height, slight, advice, clout, ouch, lout,  etc., but not in words like hide, slide, advise, cloud, gouge, loud, etc.)—is common in eastern New England, for example in Boston (and the traditional accent of Martha's Vineyard), as well as in the Upper Midwest. Raising of just  is found throughout the entire North, including in the Great Lakes area, and elsewhere in New England. This second, more focused type of raising also appears to spreading beyond the North, as well as to California English, Philadelphia English, and Western American English dialects overall.

Phonemic distribution
The following pronunciation variants used more strongly in this region than anywhere else in the country: 
crayon as the single-syllable  (phonetically )
handkerchief rhyming with beef
poem as the single-syllable , rhyming with dome
root and roof using the  vowel  as a somewhat common alternative to the typical  vowel

Declining characteristics
The North has historically been one of the last U.S. regions to maintain the distinction between /ɔr/ and /oʊr/, in which words like horse and hoarse or war and wore, for example, are not homophones; however, the merger of the two has quickly spread throughout the North. The  vowel  was once a common Northern U.S. sound in the word creek, but this has largely given way to the  vowel , as in the rest of the country.

Vocabulary
The North is reported as uniquely or most strongly using certain words:
babushka (a woman's headscarf, tied under the chin)
bare-naked (synonym for naked)
crayfish (a freshwater lobster-like crustacean)
crust (the end of a bread loaf)
diagonal or kitty-corner (situated slanted across a street or intersection)
doing cookies (rare synonym, scattered throughout the North, for doing doughnuts)
frosting (synonym for icing)
futz or futz around (to fool around or waste time)
garbage (synonym for trash)
on the fritz (out of order, or into a state of disrepair)
pit (the seed or stone of a fruit)
you guys (the usual plural form of you)
woodchuck (synonym for groundhog)

Northeastern American English

A Northeastern Corridor of the United States follows the Atlantic coast, comprising all the dialects of New England, Greater New York City, and Greater Philadelphia (including adjacent areas of New Jersey), sometimes even classified as extending to Greater Baltimore, Washington D.C., and New York's Hudson Valley. This large region, despite being home to numerous different dialects and accents, constitutes a huge area unified in certain linguistic respects, including particular notable vocabulary and phonemic incidence (that is, basic units of sound that can distinguish certain words).

Phonemic distribution
These phonemic variants in certain words are particularly correlated with the American Northeast (with the more common variants nationwide given in parentheses):
cauliflower with the "i" pronounced with the  vowel  (in addition to the  vowel )
centaur rhyming with four (in addition to the variant rhyming with far)
route rhyming with shoot (in addition to shout) 
Northern New England and many younger speakers do not retain this vowel, however.

Vocabulary
Terms common or even usual to the whole Northeast include:
brook (synonym for stream)
bureau (synonym for chest of drawers or dresser)
cellar (synonym for basement) 
cruller (a twisted, often stick-like doughnut)
goose pimples (synonym for goose bumps),
elastic, hair elastic, or hair thing (synonyms for hair tie)
papering or TP'ing (synonym for toilet papering)
rotary (synonym for traffic circle)
sneakers (any athletic shoes)
soda (any sweet, carbonated soft drink)
stoop (small outdoor staircase to a building's front door, particularly in the NYC area)
sunshower (a sunny rainshower)
tractor trailer (a semi-trailer truck)

Inland Northern, Upper Midwestern, and Northwestern American English

The recent Northern cities vowel shift, beginning only in the twentieth century, now affects much of the North away from the Atlantic coast, occurring specifically at its geographic center: the Great Lakes region. It is therefore a defining feature of the Inland North dialect (most notably spoken in Chicago, Detroit, and western New York State). The vowel shift's generating conditions are also present in some Western New England English; otherwise, however, this vowel shift is not occurring in the Northeastern United States.

North-Central American or Upper Midwestern English, based around Minnesota, northern Wisconsin, and North Dakota, may show some elements of the Northern cities vowel shift and the ANAE classifies it as a transitional dialect between the Inland North, Canada, and the West. Many Upper Midwesterners have a full cot-caught merger, which disqualifies their dialect from the traditional "Northern" definition.

Northwestern American English falls broadly under Western American English, not Northern. Also a transitional dialect, its speakers share major commonalities with Californians and Canadians.

See also
New England English
Upper Midwest American English

Notes

References

American English
Culture of the Midwestern United States
Culture of the Northeastern United States